I Am with You (French: Je suis avec toi) is a 1943 French musical comedy film directed by Henri Decoin and starring Yvonne Printemps, Pierre Fresnay and Jacques Louvigny. It was shot at the Joinville Studios in Paris. The film's sets were designed by the art director Lucien Aguettand.

Synopsis
Concerned that her husband may be unfaithful to her, a woman pretends to go on a trip but instead remains in a nearby hotel. When her husband encounters her he believes he has found his wife's exact double.

Cast
 Yvonne Printemps as Élisabeth & Irène 
 Pierre Fresnay as François 
 Jacques Louvigny as Le commissaire 
 Jean Meyer as Armand 
 Palau as Le contrôleur 
 Luce Fabiole as Tante Ellen 
 Denise Benoît as Irma 
 André Valmy as Le gérant de l'hôtel 
 Guita Karen as Madeleine 
 André Varennes as Le général 
 Robert Le Fort as Le violoniste 
 Annette Poivre as La postière 
 Henry Prestat as Le veilleur de nuit 
 Henri de Livry as Le portier
 Paulette Dubost as La standardiste 
 Bernard Blier as Robert

References

Bibliography 
 Dayna Oscherwitz & MaryEllen Higgins. The A to Z of French Cinema. Scarecrow Press, 2009.

External links 
 

1943 films
1943 musical comedy films
1940s French-language films
Films directed by Henri Decoin
Pathé films
French musical comedy films
French black-and-white films
Films shot at Joinville Studios
1940s French films